The America Zone was one of the two regional zones of the 1926 International Lawn Tennis Challenge.

5 teams entered the America Zone, with the winner going on to compete in the Inter-Zonal Final against the winner of the Europe Zone. Japan defeated Cuba in the final, and went on to face France in the Inter-Zonal Final.

Draw

Quarterfinals

Mexico vs. Japan

Semifinals

Japan vs. Philippines

Cuba vs. Canada

Final

Japan vs. Cuba

References

External links
Davis Cup official website

Davis Cup Americas Zone
America Zone
International Lawn Tennis Challenge